Palpita magniferalis, the splendid palpita snout moth, ash pyralid or ash leafroller, is a moth of the family Crambidae. It is found in eastern North America.

The wingspan is 23–27 mm. Adults are on wing from April to October.

The larvae feed on Fraxinus species.

Taxonomy
Palpita guttulosa is treated as a valid species by some authors.

External links
Bug Guide
Images

Moths described in 1861
magniferalis
Moths of North America